Red Rabbit is a spy thriller novel, written by Tom Clancy and released on August 5, 2002. The plot occurs a few months after the events of Patriot Games (1987), and incorporates the 1981 assassination attempt on Pope John Paul II. Main character Jack Ryan, now an analyst for the Central Intelligence Agency, takes part in the extraction of a Soviet defector who knows of a KGB plot to kill the pontiff. The book debuted at number one on The New York Times Best Seller list.

Plot summary
In 1982, Pope John Paul II privately issues a letter to the communist Polish government, stating that he will resign from the papacy and return to his hometown unless they cease their repression of counterrevolutionary movements in Poland, particularly the Solidarity trade union. Called the Warsaw Letter, it was later forwarded to Moscow, enraging Committee for State Security (KGB) director Yuri Andropov. He decides to plan the pope's assassination, which he believes will reinvigorate Communism in Eastern Europe, perceived by many to be in a state of decline. Known only by its designated number 15-8-82-666 for security reasons, the assassin is then selected as a Turk Muslim (understood to be Mehmet Ali Ağca), who would then be eliminated by Bulgarian KDS officer Boris Strokov afterwards for deniability. The operation was later unanimously approved by the Politburo.

Meanwhile, Oleg Zaitzev, a communications officer in the KGB tasked with sending and receiving encrypted dispatches to and from KGB stations across Europe, pieces together the plot to kill the pope, and becomes deeply troubled with the prospect of murdering an innocent person for political purposes. He later decides to make contact with the local CIA station chief, Edward Foley, as well as his wife and agent Mary Pat, intending to defect and then be extracted out of the Soviet Union with his family, in exchange for providing information on the assassination plot as well as the names of KGB deep-penetration agents in the American and British governments.

The Foleys instruct Zaitzev to bring his family to Budapest, Hungary under the guise of taking a vacation. They are then to be assisted by British Secret Intelligence Service (SIS) officers stationed in the city, because the CIA station there was compromised; as a result, Jack Ryan, former Marine and the CIA liaison to SIS in London, was sent there to represent the agency. One early morning, the Zaitzevs were spirited out of the hotel they were staying. Accompanied by Ryan, they are then smuggled to Yugoslavia, where they immediately fly to the United Kingdom. By then, SIS agents had planted dead bodies that are physically identical to the family in their hotel room, which was then set on fire, thus deceiving the KGB.

After settling down in a safehouse outside Manchester, Zaitzev reveals what he knows about the assassination plot, which alarms the SIS and the CIA. Ryan was later sent to St. Peter's Square in Vatican City to accompany the British SIS officers on the ground to ascertain how the hit on the pope will play out, as well as to try capturing the shooter. At the pope's weekly audience, Ryan manages to capture Strokov; however, the Pope gets shot anyway by the real shooter Ağca. Nevertheless, the pontiff recovers from his wounds. It was then revealed that Strokov was executed by the British as retaliation for murdering Soviet defector Georgi Markov on British soil four years ago.

Characters
 Oleg Ivanovich Zaitzev: Communications officer in the Committee for State Security, later a conscience defector to the United States (known in the CIA lexicon as "Rabbit")
 Jack Ryan: Central Intelligence Agency liaison to the Secret Intelligence Service
 Yuri Vladimirovich Andropov: KGB chairman
 Colonel Boris Andreyevich Strokov: Bulgarian KDS intelligence officer working for the KGB
 Ed Foley: CIA chief of station in Moscow, under cover as embassy press attaché
 Mary Pat Foley: CIA operative, Ed Foley's wife
 Sir Basil Charleston: Chief of the Secret Intelligence Service
 Simon Harding: SIS analyst who works directly with Ryan
 Arthur Moore: Director of Central Intelligence
 James Greer: CIA Deputy Director of Intelligence
 Robert Ritter: CIA Deputy Director of Operations. Distrustful of Ryan, an analyst, taking part in field operations.
 Cathy Ryan: Clinical instructor in ophthalmic surgery on an exchange program at St. Guy's Hospital, London; Jack Ryan's wife

Themes
Red Rabbit takes elements from Frederick Forsyth's thriller novel The Day of the Jackal (1973), although the assassin "is never so fully realized nor as sympathetic as the Jackal". Additionally in the novel, Clancy discusses the tradecraft of espionage, as well as life in Moscow before the fall of Communism.

Reception 

The novel received mixed reviews. One of its problems is wrong timing; Marc Cerasini pointed out in his essay on the novel: "After the history-making events of September 11, 2001, a nostalgic trip back to the Cold War might not have been the novel Tom Clancy's fans were anticipating." In a mixed review, Publishers Weekly derided the lack of suspense, which is "a disappointment when other writers (Forsyth in Day of the Jackal, for one) have shown that there can be enough tension in a fated-to-fail assassination plot to give a stroke to a yoga master". The book was also notable for its disregard for real history, as CNN reminded that the events in Patriot Games occur after the wedding of Prince Charles and Princess Diana, which in turn occurs after the assassination attempt on Pope John Paul II.

Conversely, the book was praised for its "believable and encyclopedic" plot; Publishers Weekly remarked: "It's utterly fascinating to read Clancy's playing out of that likely scenario—is there a writer in the world who brings so much verisimilitude to scenes both high (Politburo meetings) and low (details of spy craft and everyday Soviet life)?" The Washington Post praised the book, stating: "Clancy moves skillfully among a large cast of characters in Washington, London and Moscow, and develops many of them effectively. [His] writing has improved since the clunky prose and robotic dialogue of his early novels."

References

2002 American novels
American thriller novels
Techno-thriller novels
Prequel novels
Attempted assassination of Pope John Paul II
Novels by Tom Clancy
Ryanverse
Cultural depictions of Pope John Paul II
Novels set in Budapest
Novels set in Moscow
Novels set in Yugoslavia
Novels set in Rome
Novels set in London
G. P. Putnam's Sons books